Ǵermo is a village in the municipality of Tetovo, North Macedonia. It used to be part of the former municipality of Džepčište.

Demographics
According to the 2021 census, the village had a total of 569 inhabitants. Ethnic groups in the village include:

Albanians 538
Others 31

References

External links

Villages in Tetovo Municipality
Albanian communities in North Macedonia